Huje is a small settlement in the hills west of Ilirska Bistrica in the Inner Carniola region of Slovenia.

The small church in the settlement is dedicated to the Holy Family and belongs to the Parish of Pregarje.

References

External links

Huje on Geopedia

Populated places in the Municipality of Ilirska Bistrica